Elpitiya is a town in Galle District, Southern Province, Sri Lanka.

Elpitiya is easily accessible from the Southern Expressway (Sri Lanka). Also there are 3 other access roads from the Colombo - Galle main road at Bentota, Kosgoda and Ahungalla. Elpitiya is well known for its production of Cinnamon and Low Grown Tea. Tea, Rubber, Cinnamon and Rice are the main products in the area. There are more than a dozen tea factories and one Rubber factory in the area.

The town is believed to be originated as a Plantation and since gradually expanded to its current state. Now it is one of the biggest towns in the district and still sees rapid expansion, mainly to the new Southern Highway. Elpitiya is one of the electorate with larger population in Galle District and also is the newly formed Police Division in addition to the Galle Police Division.

Education
 Ananda Central College
 Ananda Primary College
 Nalanda Maha Vidyalaya
 St. Theresa College
 St. Mary's College
 Wallambagala KV
 Ratanasiri Royal College
 Thunduwa MMV
 Omatta Maha Vidyalaya

References

 
Populated places in Southern Province, Sri Lanka